A statue is a free-standing sculpture in which the realistic, full-length figures of persons or animals are carved or cast in a durable material such as wood, metal or stone.  Typical statues are life-sized or close to life-size; a sculpture that represents persons or animals in full figure but that is small enough to lift and carry is a statuette or figurine, whilst one more than twice life-size is a colossal statue.

Statues have been produced in many cultures from prehistory to the present; the oldest-known statue dating to about 30,000 years ago. Statues represent many different people and animals, real and mythical. Many statues are placed in public places as public art.

Color
Ancient statues often show the bare surface of the material of which they are made. For example, many people associate Greek classical art with white marble sculpture, but there is evidence that many statues were painted in bright colors. Most of the color has weathered off over time; small remnants were removed during cleaning; in some cases small traces remained that could be identified. A travelling exhibition of 20 coloured replicas of Greek and Roman works, alongside 35 original statues and reliefs, was held in Europe and the United States in 2008: Gods in Color: Painted Sculpture of Classical Antiquity. Details such as whether the paint was applied in one or two coats, how finely the pigments were ground or exactly which binding medium would have been used in each case—all elements that would affect the appearance of a finished piece—are not known.  Richter goes so far as to say of classical Greek sculpture, "All stone sculpture, whether limestone or marble, was painted, either wholly or in part."

Medieval statues were also usually painted, with some still retaining their original pigments. The coloring of statues ceased during the Renaissance, since excavated classical sculptures, which had lost their coloring, became regarded as the best models.

Historical periods

Prehistoric
The Venus of Berekhat Ram, an anthropomorphic pebble found in northern Israel and dated to at least 230,000 years before present, is claimed to be the oldest known statuette. However, researchers are divided as to whether its shape is derived from natural erosion or was carved by an early human. The Venus of Tan-Tan, a similar object of similar age found in Morocco, has also been claimed to be a statuette.

The Löwenmensch figurine and the Venus of Hohle Fels, both from Germany, are the oldest confirmed statuettes in the world, dating to 35,000-40,000 years ago.

The oldest known life-sized statue is Urfa Man found in Turkey which is dated to around 9,000 BC.

Antiquity

Religion
Throughout history, statues have been associated with cult images in many religious traditions, from Ancient Egypt, Ancient India, Ancient Greece, and Ancient Rome to the present.  Egyptian statues showing kings as sphinxes have existed since the Old Kingdom, the oldest being for Djedefre (c. 2500 BC). The oldest statue of a striding pharaoh dates from the reign of Senwosret I (c. 1950 BC) and is the Egyptian Museum, Cairo. The Middle Kingdom of Egypt (starting around 2000 BC) witnessed the growth of block statues which then became the most popular form until the Ptolemaic period (c. 300 BC).

The focal point of the cella or main interior space of a Roman or Greek temple was a statue of the deity it was dedicated to. In major temples these could be several times life-size.  Other statues of deities might have subordinate positions along the side walls.

The oldest statue of a deity in Rome was the bronze statue of Ceres in 485 BC. The oldest statue in Rome is now the statue of Diana on the Aventine.

Politics
For a successful Greek or Roman politician or businessman (who donated considerable sums to public projects for the honour), having a public statue, preferably in the local forum or the grounds of a temple was an important confirmation of status, and these sites filled up with statues on plinths (mostly smaller than those of their 19th century equivalents).  Fragments in Rome of a bronze colossus of Constantine and the marble colossus of Constantine show the enormous scale of some imperial statues; other examples are recorded, notably one of Nero.

The wonders of the world include several statues from antiquity, with the Colossus of Rhodes and the Statue of Zeus at Olympia among the Seven Wonders of the Ancient World.

Middle Ages
While sculpture generally flourished in European Medieval art, the single statue was not one of the most common types, except for figures of the Virgin Mary, usually with Child, and the corpus or body of Christ on crucifixes.  Both of these appeared in all size up to life-size, and by the late Middle Ages many churches, even in villages, had a crucifixion group around a rood cross.  The Gero Cross in Cologne is both one of the earliest and finest large figures of the crucified Christ.  As yet, full-size standing statues of saints and rulers were uncommon, but tomb effigies, generally lying down, were very common for the wealthy from about the 14th century, having spread downwards from royal tombs in the centuries before.

While Byzantine art flourished in various forms, sculpture and statue making witnessed a general decline; although statues of emperors continued to appear. An example was the statue of Justinian (6th century) which stood in the square across from the Hagia Sophia until the fall of Constantinople in the 15th century. Part of the decline in statue making in the Byzantine period can be attributed to the mistrust the Church placed in the art form, given that it viewed sculpture in general as a method for making and worshiping idols. While making statues was not subject to a general ban, it was hardly encouraged in this period. Justinian was one of the last Emperors to have a full-size statue made, and secular statues of any size became virtually non-existent after iconoclasm; and the artistic skill for making statues was lost in the process.

Renaissance
Italian Renaissance art identified the standing statue as the key form of Roman art to survive, and there was a great revival of statues of both religious and secular figures, to which most of the leading figures contributed, led by Donatello and Michelangelo.  The equestrian statue, a great technical challenge, was mastered again, and gradually statue groups.

These trends intensified in Baroque art, when every ruler wanted to have statues made of themself, and Catholic churches filled with crowds of statues of saints, although after the Protestant Reformation religious sculpture largely disappeared from Protestant churches, with some exceptions in large Lutheran German churches.  In England, churches instead were filled with increasing elaborate tomb monuments, for which the ultimate models were continental extravagances such as the Papal tombs in Rome, those of the Doges of Venice, or the French royal family.

In the late 18th and 19th century there was a growth in public open air statues of public figures on plinths. As well as monarches, politicians, generals, landowners, and eventually artists and writers were commemorated. World War I saw the war memorial, previously uncommon, become very widespread, and these were often statues of generic soldiers.

Modern Era
Starting with the work of Maillol around 1900, the human figures embodied in statues began to move away from the various schools of realism that been followed for thousands of years. The Futurist and Cubist schools took this metamorphism even further until statues, often still nominally representing humans, had lost all but the most rudimentary relationship to the human form.  By the 1920s and 1930s statues began to appear that were completely abstract in design and execution.

The notion that the position of the hooves of horses in equestrian statues indicated the rider's cause of death has been disproved.

Gallery

See also 

 Bronze sculpture
 Bust (sculpture)
 Equestrian sculpture
 Figurine
 History of sculpture
 List of statues
 List of tallest statues
 List of statues of Queen Victoria
 List of colossal sculpture in situ
 Mannequin
 Living statue
 Memorial
 Monument
 Sculpture
 Statues of Gudea, c. 2100 BC
 Statuette
 Stone carving
 Stone sculpture
 Venus figurines

References

External links

 UK Public Monument and Sculpture Association

 
Types of sculpture
Sculpture terms